Li Ting (born 15 February 1991) is a Chinese former female tennis player.

Li has won seven doubles titles on the ITF circuit in her career. On 13 June 2011, she reached her best singles ranking of world number 528. On 17 October 2011, she peaked at world number 239 in the doubles rankings. Li made her WTA tour debut at the 2009 Guangzhou International Women's Open. Li retirement from professional tennis 2013.

Career finals

Singles (0–1)

Doubles (7–0)

References

External links
 
 

1991 births
Living people
Chinese female tennis players
Universiade medalists in tennis
Universiade silver medalists for China
Medalists at the 2011 Summer Universiade
21st-century Chinese women